This is a list of airlines currently operating in Samoa.

See also
 List of airlines
 List of defunct airlines of Samoa

Samoa
Airlines
Airlines
Samoa